Isocossus zolotuhini is a moth in the family Cossidae. It is found in central Vietnam.

The length of the forewings is about 24 mm, with wingspan of about 52 mm.

Etymology
The species is named in honour of Russian lepidopterist Dr. Vadim Zolotuhin.

References

Natural History Museum Lepidoptera generic names catalog

Cossinae
Moths described in 2015
Moths of Asia